"Everybody Talks" is the lead single from the second studio album, Picture Show, by American rock band Neon Trees. It was released on December 20, 2011, in the United States as a digital download on iTunes. It soon became a sleeper hit. The song made it to No. 6 on the Billboard Hot 100, making this song their highest charting single to date as well as their first Top 10 hit. The song was produced by Justin Meldal-Johnsen, engineered by Greg Collins, mixed by Billy Bush, and mastered by Joe LaPorta.

As of October 2012, the song has sold over 2 million digital downloads. It also hit No. 7 on the Alternative Songs chart, their first Top 10 hit after Animal. It also hit No. 1 on the Adult Pop Songs, their first song to do so.

"Everybody Talks" was inspired by early 1960s pop music; Tyler Glenn said that "We fell in love with a lot of like Roy Orbison and the Motown music that my dad listens to." Glenn later revealed via Twitter, during National Coming Out Day in 2020, that he had written the song while closeted about an ex-girlfriend who had spread rumors that he was gay.

Reception
The song has received generally positive reviews from critics. PopCrush gave it 4 of 5 stars stating that they would announced November 20, 2011 at the Habits tour In November 2011   it was their song 2011-2014  "people can relate to 'Everybody Talks'." About.com said it was, "a song that will work with a very wide audience".

Music video
An animated music video to accompany the release of "Everybody Talks" was first released onto YouTube on January 14, 2012, at a total length of three minutes and forty-two seconds.

The live-action music video for "Everybody Talks" was released on VEVO and YouTube on March 8, 2012. It features the band at a 1950s-esque drive-in watching a movie called Zombie Bikers From Hell.  In the film, band members are playing music to the song inside a cabin when they are attacked by a group of zombies who are leather-clad motorcycle riders. Lead singer Tyler Glenn is the only one to escape, while the other band members are slaughtered by the zombies, offscreen, to the horror of the audience members at the drive-in.

Meanwhile, in the "real life" drive-in, a girl wearing red sunglasses starts seducing various male patrons. Once she and the men are alone in a secluded area, she reveals herself to be a fire-breathing vampire and eats them. In the film, Glenn hitches a ride from a girl in red-sunglasses. As they drive off in a white van, Glenn's fate remains unknown. However, Glenn and the girl are present at the drive-in. The girl who drove up in the van at the end of the movie is in the same van the band drove up to the cabin in.

In popular culture
The song was covered by Jake Puckerman (Jacob Artist) and Kitty Wilde (Becca Tobin) for the 2012 Glee episode, "The Role You Were Born to Play".
The song appeared in the 2012 movie American Reunion.
The song was used in a 2012 Buick television commercial promoting the 2012 model of the Verano.
The song was used in 2012 in the fifth episode of the second season of American TV series Homeland.
The song was used in 2013 in the ninth episode of the second season of Australian TV series House Husbands.
In 2014, the song was utilized in television and radio ad campaigns throughout Latin America for services provided by mobile phone operator, Movistar.
The song appears as a playable track in Guitar Hero Live.
The song appears as a playable DLC track in Rock Band 4.
The song appears in the Russian television series Kitchen.

Track listing

Charts

Weekly charts

Year-end charts

Certifications

Release history

References

2011 singles
Neon Trees songs
Songs written by Tyler Glenn
2011 songs
Songs written by Tim Pagnotta